Zentbach is a river of Upper Franconia, Bavaria, Germany. The Zentbach is a nine kilometer long northeastern, right tributary of the Main near Mainleus.

See also
List of rivers of Bavaria

References

Rivers of Bavaria
Rivers of Germany